Kevin Mombilo (born 6 May 1993) is a Finnish professional footballer who plays as a right winger for Albanian Superliga side FK Partizani Tirana. He is of Congolese descent.

References

  Profile at veikkausliiga.com
 Mombilo's blog

External links
 

1993 births
Living people
Finnish footballers
Finland youth international footballers
Finnish people of Democratic Republic of the Congo descent
Democratic Republic of the Congo footballers
Democratic Republic of the Congo emigrants to Finland
Veikkausliiga players
Ykkönen players
Kategoria Superiore players
Klubi 04 players
FC Honka players
Pallohonka players
FC Jazz players
PK-35 Vantaa (men) players
FC Inter Turku players
Kemi City F.C. players
FK Partizani Tirana players
Association football forwards